This is a list of the Hong Kong national football team results from 1952 to the present day that, for various reasons, are not accorded the status of official internationals.

1950s

1960s

1970s

1980s

1990s

2000s

2010s

References

Unofficial
Lists of national association football team unofficial results